The Luton by-election was a Parliamentary by-election held on 20 July 1911. It returned one Member of Parliament (MP) to the House of Commons of the Parliament of the United Kingdom, elected by the first past the post voting system.

Vacancy
Thomas Ashton had been the Liberal MP here since 1895. Luton had been Liberal since the seat was created in 1885. He was raised to the peerage as Baron Ashton of Hyde, in the County of Chester, with a seat in the House of Lords.

Electoral history

Candidates
The new Liberal candidate selected to defend the seat was Cecil Harmsworth. He had been Liberal MP for Droitwich, Worcestershire until his defeat there in January 1910. 
The Conservatives re-selected John Owen Hickman, who had been their candidate last time.

Result

Aftermath
A General Election was due to take place by the end of 1915. By the autumn of 1914, the following candidates had been adopted to contest that election. Due to the outbreak of war, the election never took place.

Harmsworth was the endorsed candidate of the Coalition Government.

References 

Luton by-election
Luton
Luton 1911
Politics of Luton
Luton by-election 1911
Luton by-election